Mouais (Gallo: Móaè,) is a commune in the Loire-Atlantique department in western France.

History
It is possible that the toponym comes from the hagionym Moë, an obscure Breton saint.

Geography
The town is located on the northern edge of the department, on the right bank of the river Chère, which forms most of its southern border.

Population

Personalities
Jean Fréour, sculptor

See also
Communes of the Loire-Atlantique department

References

Communes of Loire-Atlantique
Loire-Atlantique communes articles needing translation from French Wikipedia